The Rustavi International Motorpark is a motor racing venue located  south-east of Tbilisi, Georgia.

History
Rustavi was the last race track built in the USSR. A karting track, automobile cross circuit and motorbike track were also included in the complex, as well as grandstands for 500–800 people. A technical building and hotel were located nearby. The first races took place at the end of 1979. Until 1989 the track hosted eleven USSR Championship events; however, from 1989 until 2009 the track was not maintained and fell into decay. In 2009 the private company Stromos bought the site at a state auction and began redevelopment.

Reconstruction
After being bought by Somos the track was totally rebuilt and has multiple configuration changes. More than 250000 m3 of soil have been moved. New permanent concrete grandstand was erected, which would seat 2,000 people comfortably. 28 FIA-standard pit boxes were built with a Tribune 2, restaurant and conference hall upstairs. Race control tower is located at the third floor of the pitbuilding.

A tunnel for heavy trucks was made under the straight between Turn 2 and Turn 3. A pedestrian tunnel was added to connect main grandstand with the paddock. Spectators can get to the newly built Tribune 3 across a bridge with two Svanuri towers.

The track has been equipped with several engineering systems like video surveillance covering the whole track, 14 electronically controlled signaling lights, a fiber-optic network, sound distribution and AMB timekeeping with 5 loops.

The start-finish line has been extended half mile to serve as a dragstrip.

Safety

After the reconstruction the raceway satisfies to the FIA Grade 2 safety regulations that allow to host the most of international racing series including GP2. All runoff areas are filled with gravel of special type, but the most critical ones have asphalted surface.

Events

In 2012 the track hostEd events of different types, like 8-staged national Legends car racing, the Formula Alfa championships
, drag racing, pairs racing, drifting, karting, motorcycles and club racing. Tickets are priced at 5 GEL (about $3.00) and available at the gate. Major events are covered in local "Channel 1" (Georgian Public Broadcaster). Since July 14, 2012 the local bookmaker "EuropeBet" has given A line on the main race groups of the Georgian Open Championship.

Teams

The motorpark is home for several newly established national teams, such as Gulf Racing, Liberty Bank Racing, MIA Force, Team Ajara, VTB Bank, Sports Ministry Team and GPB Team.

Track specifications

Layouts

Lap records

The official race lap records at the Rustavi International Motorpark are listed as:

References

 Professional Motorsport World, April-June 2011
 Saakashvili opens race track in Rustavi
 1 TV: New racing track opened in Rustavi
 PrimeTime News: Michael Saakashvili opens reconstructed raceway in Rustavi 
 Saakashvili at the raceway opening

External links
 Official site
 Autosport in USSR. Circuit in Rustavi 

Motorsport venues in Georgia (country)
Rustavi
Buildings and structures in Kvemo Kartli